The 1982 Pittsburgh Panthers football team represented the University of Pittsburgh as independent during in the 1982 NCAA Division I-A football season.

Schedule

Personnel

Coaching staff

Rankings

Game summaries

North Carolina

West Virginia

at Penn State

vs. SMU (Cotton Bowl)

1983 NFL Draft

References

Pittsburgh
Pittsburgh Panthers football seasons
Pittsburgh Panthers football